Ballachulish was a railway station at Ballachulish on the southern shore of Loch Leven at East Laroch (south Ballachulish) in Highland. It was the terminus of the Ballachulish branch line that linked to the main line of the Callander and Oban Railway at Connel Ferry.

History 

This station opened as Ballachulish on 20 August 1903 with two platforms. There was a goods yard on the north side of the station. Within two years it was renamed as Ballachulish & Glencoe and renamed again following the opening of the 'new' road between Glencoe Village and Kinlochleven in 1908 as Ballachulish (Glencoe) for Kinlochleven. Apart for a short closure in 1953, this latter name remained until closure in 1966. In the railway timetables the name was shortened to simply Ballachulish with a note stating "Ballachulish is the Station for Glencoe and Kinlochleven".

The station then passed to the Scottish Region of British Railways on nationalisation in 1948, and was closed by the British Railways Board in 1966, when the Ballachulish Branch closed.

In the early 1990s the station buildings were converted into a medical centre.

Houses have been built in the station yard. The engine shed remained, being used by a local garage until 2015, when it was demolished to make way for more private housing.

Stationmasters

James Skinner 1903 - 1914
William Reid 1938 - 1941 (afterwards station master at Callander)
George Roger 1941 - 1943 (formerly station master at Burrelton)
Duncan Donald MacNaughton 1943 - 1947 (formerly station master at Errol, afterwards station master at Coupar Angus)
James Matthewson from 1959 (formerly station master at Kirriemuir)

Signalling 
Throughout its existence, the Ballachulish Branch was worked by the electric token system. Ballachulish signal box was located west of the platforms, on the north side of the railway. It had 21 levers.

References

Notes

Sources 
 
 
 
 
 Ballachulish station on navigable 1954 map

Railway stations in Great Britain opened in 1903
Railway stations in Great Britain closed in 1966
Disused railway stations in Highland (council area)
Beeching closures in Scotland
Former Caledonian Railway stations
James Miller railway stations